17th Battalion or 17th Infantry Battalion may refer to:

 17th Battalion (Australia), a unit of the Australian Army which was initially formed in the First Australian Imperial Force
 2/17th Battalion (Australia), a unit of the Australian Army that served within the Second Australian Imperial Force
 17th Infantry Battalion (Philippines), a unit of the Philippine Army